Valley Fault System is the common name for fault systems in valleys and basins including:

Independence Valley fault system
Wabash Valley Fault System
Marikina Valley Fault System